Chen Tianzhuo (born 1985) is a Chinese contemporary artist known for outlandish performance video work and installations.

Life and work 

Chen was born in Beijing in 1985. He has been described as "one [of] the most promising young artists in China."

He studied for his Bachelor of Fine Arts from 2007 until 2009 at the Central Saint Martins College of Art and Design and went to get his master's degree from Chelsea College of Art in 2010.

His work has been shown internationally, and more recently July 2014 in Shanghai in "Electric Kool-Aid Acid Test: Chen Tianzhuo."

His latest work debuted November 6, 2014 at K11 in Hong Kong supported by Adrian Cheng. The show titled WAWADOLL IS X’MAS DATA—a solo exhibition by TIANZHUO CHEN is "Chen’s first solo exhibition in Hong Kong is also his first large-scale installation outside of a gallery" and is curated by Leap Magazine and Art Papers Editor in Chief, Robin Peckham.

Chen currently lives and works in Beijing and London.

Solo exhibitions
 2015 - TIANZHUO CHEN, Palais de Tokyo, Paris
 2014 - "PICNIC PARADI$E BITCH" , BANK, Shanghai
 2013 - "Tianzhuo’s Acid Club" , Star gallery, Beijing
 2012 - "Gas Station" Soloshow of Tianzhuo Chen and Rongrong Bi, Vanguard gallery, Shanghai
 2011 - "The Great exhibition" Solo show of Tianzhuo Chen and Xinyi Liu, curated by Wei Guo & Chloe Hipeau

Group exhibitions

2014 
 "MEMOIRS OF AMNESIAC-!", MAISON POPULAIRE, Paris
 "2014 Wuhan 3rd Documentary Exhibition of Fine Arts", Hubei Museum of Art, Wuhan
 "Conditions", Destination, Beijing
 "MÉMOIRES D’UN AMNÉSIQUE – ?"，MAINSD’ŒUVRES，Paris
 "SANKUANZ FW2015 Collection"，London Fashion Week，London
 "Decorum",Powerstation of Art,Shanghai
 "SANKUANZ FW2014 Collection"，Shanghai Fashion Week，Shanghai

2013 
 "Drawing-Expression and limit",Amnua,Nanjing
 "Wave" Bund 18, Shanghai
 "Hot City" L-Artgallery, Chengdu
 "Eric Cartman’s Loser Club" Art Beijing, Beijing
 "Kangrinboqê－SANKUANZ FW2013 Collection"，Shanghai Fashion Week，Shanghai
 "Existence – +Follow" Shanghai MOCA, Shanghai

2012 
 "Kathmandu International Art Festival", Kathmandu
 "Narcissism" Star gallery, Beijing
 "Being misread on 16th October", Bridge gallery, Beijing
 "Get it Louder 2012", Beijing
 "The Graduals", Traffic, Dubai
 "First Issue", SH Contemporary, Shanghai
 "Also World", T Art Center, Beijing
 "Spot Light", Bund 18, Shanghai
 "Nowhere to Live", Star Gallery, Beijing
 "The Halo Effect", V Art Center, Shanghai
 "Yeast″, Season gallery, Beijing

2011 
 "Asia Triennial Manchester", Manchester
 "Peckham 90210″, N/V Projects, London
 "UK CHINA Art&Design Festival-The catalyst", Great western studios, London
 "Parallax Art Fair",  La Galleria, Royal Opera Arcade, London
 "Life is elsewhere", Crypt gallery, London

2010 
 "Wild Wicked and Wanton", The Lewisham Arthouse, London
 "MA Show 2010″, 1st Sept-5th Sept,  Chelsea college of art, London
 "Royal Academy summer exhibition", 14Jun-22 Aug, Royal Academy, London
 "Chelsea MA interim show", Chelsea college of art, london
 "Askew show- in the garden of desire" , The castle, London
 "Condensation", Hanbury hall, london
 "Chelsea salon", Auto-Italia south east, london

2009 

 "Chelsea salon", Auto-Italia south east, london
 "Cheers", Barge house, London
 "CSM Degree show", Barge house, London
 "CSM work in progress show", Colomb gallery, London

2008 
 "Hot Shock", Shanghai
 "Foundry", London
 "China Design now", V&A Museum, London

2007 
 "Flow", 798 Space, Beijing.
 "Tiger Translate", X-Change Gallery, New York, Berlin and Beijing.

2006 
 "Chinese shadow", Shanghai Biennale, Shanghai.

See also 
 Robin Peckham

References

External links
 Official Artists Website
 Tianzhuo Chen's Artwork at Vanguard Shanghai
 Tianzhuo Chen on Saatchi Online
 Artist Work at Star Gallery Beijing

1985 births
Living people
Painters from Beijing
Chinese contemporary artists